Tarrant County College (TCC) or Tarrant County College District (TCCD) is a public community college in Tarrant County, Texas.  It offers Associate of Arts, an Associate of Science, an Associate of Applied Science, and Associate of Arts in Teaching degrees. As of 2008, the institution was ranked as the sixth largest in Texas among community colleges and universities with student enrollment for credit hours of 98,000.  Five physical campuses, a virtual campus (TCC Connect) and a centralized office make up the TCC District.

Originally called Tarrant County Junior College (TCJC), the school began on July 31, 1965, after voters approved a bond election for the formation of a junior college district. In 1958, the South Campus was the first campus to open in south Fort Worth; in 1967, the Northeast Campus was built in Hurst. A third campus, Northwest, was added in 1976, in northwest Fort Worth.  In 1996, the Southeast Campus was built in Arlington. The fifth, Trinity River Campus, opened in downtown Fort Worth fall of 2009. In 1999, the College District decided to drop the "Junior" from the college name.

As defined by the Texas Legislature, the official service area of TCCD includes all of Tarrant County.

Notable alumni 
Charles Baker, actor
Leon Bridges, musician
Deborah Crombie, author
Wendy Davis, politician 
Stephen Mosher, photographer
Post Malone, rapper (dropped out)
Jonathan Stickland, businessman and politician
Mack White, cartoonist

Collegiate High Schools 

Tarrant County College offers several dual-credit programs that offer an Associates Degree along with a High School Diploma. These schools are called "Collegiate High Schools."

Marine Creek Collegiate High School (Northwest Campus)
Texas Academy of Biomedical Sciences (Trinity River Campus)
TCC South Campus - FWISD Early Collegiate High School (South Campus)
Collegiate Academy at Tarrant County College (Northeast Campus)
Arlington Collegiate High School (Southeast Campus)

References

External links
Official website
Photos of Tarrant County College hosted by the Portal to Texas History

Universities and colleges in Fort Worth, Texas
Two-year colleges in the United States
Universities and colleges in the Dallas–Fort Worth metroplex
Education in Arlington, Texas
Distance education institutions based in the United States
Educational institutions established in 1965
Universities and colleges accredited by the Southern Association of Colleges and Schools
Community colleges in Texas
Universities and colleges in Tarrant County, Texas
1965 establishments in Texas